Edmond Bezik (born 12 August 1975 in Tehran, Iran) is a retired Armenian-Iranian footballer and coach. He played for Persepolis, Sepahan and Ararat Tehran and was a member of Iran national football team. He is currently head coach of Persepolis's under-23 team.

Club career
Bezik originally started his play in the FC Ararat Tehran, which has a policy of recruiting young Iranian footballers of Armenian ancestry. There he was noticed for his impressive finishing skills, and was soon transferred to Persepolis Tehran. There he was able to please fans and scored some memorable goals. Arguably his most memorable game may have been in 1996 during the Tehran derby between Persepolis FC and Esteghlal. Persepolis had not beaten Esteghlal for seven seasons, but Bezik was able to score the last minute winner in that match to claim a spot in many Persepolis fan's hearts.

Success was short-lived though and after a couple of very poor seasons, he along with many other Persepolis players were let go from the team. Bezik was immediately signed by Foolad Sepahan. His move to Isfahan was just what his career needed. In the 2002–03 season of the IPL, Bezik became the league's top goalscorer with 13 goals, and led the team to the league championship. He was deservedly called up to the national team and was starting to make his way into the squad when he became injured. He has come back from his injury but has not been able to score consistently. When new Sepahan manager, Luka Bonačić was hired, he deemed that Bezik was not needed for the squad.

Bezik signed a one-year contract with Azadegan League outfit, Shahrdari Bandar Abbas, with whom he will be playing until the end of the 2006–07 season.

Bezik's work ethic, and hard work is always a positive point for his clubs.

Top goalscorer
Having scored 22 goals for Ararat, 32 goals for Persepolis and 30 goals for Sepahan, he scored a total number of 84 goals during his time in Iran's top division football league, becoming the top division's all-time top goalscorer.

Honours

Club
Persepolis
Iranian Football League (3): 1996–97, 1998–99, 1999–2000
Hazfi Cup (1): 1998–99

Sepahan
Iranian Football League (1): 2002–03
Hazfi Cup (1): 2003–04

Individual
Iran Pro League Top Goalscorer: 2002–03

References
"Close-Up on Edmond Bezik" Persianfootball.com, 2 January 2005, Retrieved 18 July 2006
 "مصاحبه با ادموند بزيك" Tebyan.net, 29 May 2003, Retrieved 18 July 2006

External links
Edmond Bezik at TeamMelli.com
Edmond Bezik at Tehran Football Committee

1975 births
Living people
Sportspeople from Tehran
Iranian people of Armenian descent
Iranian footballers
Ethnic Armenian sportspeople
Iran international footballers
Association football forwards
Persepolis F.C. players
Shahrdari Bandar Abbas players
Sepahan S.C. footballers
F.C. Ararat Tehran players
Persian Gulf Pro League players
Azadegan League players
Persepolis F.C. non-playing staff